Janne Jalasvaara (born 15 April 1984) is a Finnish professional ice hockey defenceman. He is currently playing for Brûleurs de Loups  of the French Synerglace Ligue Magnus.

Career
Jalasvaara has played in Liiga for Espoo Blues and KalPa, the Kontinental Hockey League for Dynamo Moscow, HC Sochi and Kunlun Red Star and in the Swedish Hockey League for Rögle BK and Timrå IK. He has won the Gagarin Cup twice with HC Dynamo Moscow and was chosen to the 2013 Finland men's national ice hockey team for the 2013 IIHF World Championship.

Career statistics

Regular season and playoffs

References

External links
 

1984 births
Living people
Dynamo Balashikha players
HC Dynamo Moscow players
Espoo Blues players
KalPa players
Kiekko-Vantaa players
HC Kunlun Red Star players
Finnish ice hockey defencemen
Rögle BK players
HC Salamat players
HC Sochi players
Sportspeople from Oulu
Timrå IK players
Lahti Pelicans players
HK Dukla Trenčín players
Finnish expatriate ice hockey players in China
Finnish expatriate ice hockey players in Russia
Finnish expatriate ice hockey players in Sweden
Finnish expatriate ice hockey players in Slovakia
Finnish expatriate ice hockey players in France